The Pacific long-tailed cuckoo (Urodynamis taitensis), also known as the long-tailed cuckoo, long-tailed koel, sparrow hawk, home owl, screecher, screamer or  in Māori, is a species of the Cuculidae bird family (the cuckoos). It is a migratory bird that spends spring and summer in New Zealand, its only breeding place, and spends winter in the Pacific islands. It is a brood parasite, laying its eggs in the nests of other bird species and leaving them to raise its chicks.

Taxonomy
Urodynamis taitensis is most closely related to the channel-billed cuckoo (Scythrops novaehollandiae), which lives in Australia, Papua New Guinea and Indonesia, according to Sorenson and Payne (2005). Accordingly, it is not part of the Eudynamys genus (the true koels), with which it has previously been placed.

Description 
The long-tailed cuckoo has a length of approximately 40–42 cm; wingspan of approximately 47–52 cm and weighs about 120 grams. Large cuckoo with broad pointed wings, very long tail and softly rounded at the tip, and short stout with two coloured bill, both slightly hooked tip. Brown barring to brown upperparts, and dark streaking to white underparts. Both males and females share similar features. Young cuckoo is very different from adult: it is spotted, and buff underneath and on sides of head and neck.

Adult. Top of head and hindneck, dark brown, boldly streaked buff. Supercilium, White's, bordered below by bold dark-brown eye stripe continuing downsides of neck, cheeks, chin, throat and foreneck, whites with thin brown stripes and fine black streaking on near neck and throat. The remainder of the upperparts are brown with white spotting on wing. Tail is tipped white. The underbody is white with course black brown streaking. Legs and feet are gray to green.

Long-tailed cuckoo have a loud and intense sound, a "shrill whistle"; it is sometimes called the "screamer".

Distribution and habitat 
Endemic to New Zealand, where they can be found on Little Barrier Island, the West Coast of the South Island, Nelson, and throughout the central North Island.

Long-tailed cuckoo prefer to live in forest on mainland and near shore or offshore islands, from sea level. in mountainous areas, more often on vegetated ridges than in valleys. Usually in dense, closed canopy of native forests dominated by beech Nothofagus, broadleaf species or podocarps or mixtures, with or without shrub layer. Usually surrounded by plantations of Pines (Pinus). Can be around other vegetation such as manuka Lepotospermum scoparium by rivers or forests or mountainous areas. Occasionally can be found in recreational parks, residential areas and gardens.

In New Zealand the cuckoos live mainly in native forest, particularly up in the canopy. They also live in exotic pine plantations, scrub, cultivated land and suburban gardens. In the Pacific islands they live in lowland forest, gardens and coconut plantations. Individuals are usually solitary.

The long-tailed cuckoo breeds only in New Zealand, where it is resident in the warmer months, from early October until February or March, sometimes April and occasionally later. The length of an average one-way journey from New Zealand to Polynesia is around 2500-3500 kilometers  and thus travel over 6000 kilometers. For winter it migrates to islands right across the southern Pacific. It is found year-round on the Kermadec Islands, the Norfolk Island group and the Lord Howe Island group, which are subtropical islands part way between the New Zealand mainland and the tropical Pacific Islands. The spread of its winter distribution is extraordinarily wide, stretching almost 11,000 km from Palau in the west to Pitcairn Island. Over most of its winter range, it is known by the indigenous name,  (or local variations of this). In spring, the bird's routes of migration would almost certainly have served to guide the Polynesian ancestors of Māori to find New Zealand.

Behaviour

Breeding 
Long-tailed cuckoo have many partners during their lifetime. They mate and break-up easily. Males gain attraction from females through spanning their wings and fluttering them whilst calling.

Male cuckoo have a high pitched sound and they are very territorial. You will hear them calling either to make known their territory to other birds or as a call for a mate. Female cuckoo are similar in their vocal intensity. Their behaviour is sexual and combative when mating. Male often display their wings or their ability to fly well when looking for a mate.

Cuckoos do not build their own nest or rear their young. The species is a brood parasite laying its eggs in the nests of Mohoua species mostly – whiteheads (M. albicilla) in the North Island and yellowheads  (M. ochrocephala) and brown creepers  (M. novaeseelandiae) in the South Island. They also lay in robin (Petroica australis longpipes) and tomtit (Petroica macrocephala toitoi) nests. The eggs hatch before those of the host and the young chicks eject the eggs of the host. Long-tailed cuckoo chicks are able to mimic the calls of their host's chicks.

Feeding 
Long-tailed cuckoo eat mostly insects. They also eat bird eggs and nestling birds, adult birds as large as sparrows, New Zealand bellbirds and thrushes, and lizards. They occasionally eat fruit and seeds. Young birds are fed insects by their host parents.

Long-tailed cuckoo hardly ever forage on the ground however they do forage and the top of trees or in shrubs. Foraging is mainly done at night.

Predators 
Long-tailed cuckoo are an at risk species in New Zealand and are very uncommon. Predators include rats and stoats.

In culture 
Māori believed that the arrival of long-tailed cuckoos indicated that it was time to plant sweet potato or kumara, and that their departure meant it was time to harvest them.

References

Davies, N. (2000). Cuckoos, Cowbirds and Other Cheats. T & A D Poyser, London, 

Cuculidae
Birds of New Zealand
Birds of the Pacific Ocean
Birds described in 1787
Taxonomy articles created by Polbot
Taxa named by Anders Sparrman